The 2002–03 NHL season was the 86th regular season of the National Hockey League. The Stanley Cup winners were the New Jersey Devils, who won the best of seven series 4–3 against the Mighty Ducks of Anaheim.

Regular season
The regular season saw several surprises. The San Jose Sharks, who many felt would be one of the elite teams in the West, stumbled early and badly disassembled much of the team. The two-year-old Minnesota Wild, on the other hand, got out to an early start and held onto their first-ever playoff berth throughout the season, winning coach Jacques Lemaire the Jack Adams Award.

The elite teams of previous years such as the Detroit Red Wings, St. Louis Blues, Colorado Avalanche and New Jersey Devils, were joined by two younger Canadian teams, the Ottawa Senators and Vancouver Canucks. The Dallas Stars, which had missed the playoffs the year before, returned as a major power, backed by the record-setting goaltending of Marty Turco.

The most surprising team was probably the Tampa Bay Lightning, which many had predicted to finish last, winning their first Southeast Division title and making the playoffs for the first time in seven years. The most disappointing teams, other than the Sharks, were the New York Rangers, who finished out of the playoffs again despite bearing the league's leading payroll, and the Carolina Hurricanes, who finished last overall after a surprise run to the Stanley Cup Final the year before. On January 8, 2003, Chicago Blackhawks goaltender Michael Leighton gained a shutout in his NHL debut in a 0–0 tie versus the Phoenix Coyotes. Coyotes goaltender Zac Bierk earned his first career shutout, although it was not his NHL debut. It was the first—and with the abolition of ties two years later, the only—time that two goalies in the same game both earned their first career shutouts.

At the midpoint of the season, the Canucks led the Western Conference and Ottawa led the East. Vancouver stumbled somewhat over the stretch and lost the Northwest Division title to Colorado and the Western Conference to Dallas. Ottawa continued to dominate, having the best season in franchise history and winning both the Eastern Conference and the Presidents' Trophy.

The season was also marred by financial difficulties. Despite their success, the Ottawa Senators were in bankruptcy protection for almost all of 2003, and at one point could not pay the players. Owner Rod Bryden tried a variety of innovative financing strategies, but these all failed and the team was purchased after the season by billionaire Eugene Melnyk. The Buffalo Sabres also entered bankruptcy protection before being bought by New York businessman Tom Golisano. The financial struggles of the Pittsburgh Penguins continued as the team continued to unload its most expensive players.

The season was marked by a great number of coaches being fired, from Bob Hartley in Colorado to Darryl Sutter in San Jose and Bryan Trottier of the New York Rangers.

Worries over the decline in scoring and the neutral zone trap continued. The season began with an attempted crack down on obstruction and interference, but by the midpoint of the season this effort had petered out.

Final standings
Note: W = Wins, L = Losses, T = Ties, OTL = Overtime Losses, GF = Goals For, GA = Goals Against, Pts = Points

Eastern Conference

Western Conference

Source:

Playoffs

Bracket

Awards
The NHL Awards presentation took place in Toronto.

All-Star teams

Player statistics

Regular season

Scoring leaders
Note: GP = Games Played, G = Goals, A = Assists, Pts = Points

Source: NHL.

Leading goaltenders

Note: GP = Games played; Min = Minutes played; GA = Goals against; GAA = Goals against average; W = Wins; L = Losses; T = Ties; SO = Shutouts

Playoffs

Scoring leaders 
Note: GP = Games Played, G = Goals, A = Assists, Pts = Points

Coaches

Eastern Conference
Atlanta Thrashers: Curt Fraser, Don Waddell and Bob Hartley
Boston Bruins: Robbie Ftorek and Mike O'Connell
Buffalo Sabres: Lindy Ruff
Carolina Hurricanes: Paul Maurice
Florida Panthers: Mike Keenan
Montreal Canadiens: Michel Therrien and Claude Julien
New Jersey Devils: Pat Burns
New York Islanders: Peter Laviolette
New York Rangers: Bryan Trottier and Glen Sather
Ottawa Senators: Jacques Martin
Philadelphia Flyers: Ken Hitchcock
Pittsburgh Penguins: Rick Kehoe
Tampa Bay Lightning: John Tortorella
Toronto Maple Leafs: Pat Quinn
Washington Capitals: Bruce Cassidy

Western Conference
Mighty Ducks of Anaheim: Mike Babcock
Calgary Flames: Greg Gilbert, Al MacNeil and Darryl Sutter
Chicago Blackhawks: Brian Sutter
Colorado Avalanche: Bob Hartley and Tony Granato
Columbus Blue Jackets: Dave King and Doug MacLean
Dallas Stars: Dave Tippett
Detroit Red Wings: Dave Lewis
Edmonton Oilers: Craig MacTavish
Los Angeles Kings: Andy Murray
Minnesota Wild: Jacques Lemaire
Nashville Predators: Barry Trotz
Phoenix Coyotes: Bobby Francis
San Jose Sharks: Darryl Sutter, Cap Raeder and Ron Wilson
St. Louis Blues: Joel Quenneville
Vancouver Canucks: Marc Crawford

Milestones

Debuts
The following is a list of players of note who played their first NHL game in 2002–03 (listed with their first team):

Martin Gerber, Mighty Ducks of Anaheim
Tim Thomas, Boston Bruins
Ryan Miller, Buffalo Sabres
Jordan Leopold, Calgary Flames
Rick Nash, Columbus Blue Jackets
Steve Ott, Dallas Stars
Henrik Zetterberg, Detroit Red Wings
Ales Hemsky, Edmonton Oilers
Jarret Stoll, Edmonton Oilers
Jay Bouwmeester, Florida Panthers
Alexander Frolov, Los Angeles Kings
Cristobal Huet, Los Angeles Kings
Joe Corvo, Los Angeles Kings
Mike Cammalleri, Los Angeles Kings
Pierre-Marc Bouchard, Minnesota Wild
Francois Beauchemin, Montreal Canadiens
Anton Volchenkov, Ottawa Senators
Jason Spezza, Ottawa Senators
Ray Emery, Ottawa Senators
Dennis Seidenberg, Philadelphia Flyers
Jonathan Cheechoo, San Jose Sharks
Matt Stajan, Toronto Maple Leafs

Last games

The following is a list of players of note who played their last NHL game in 2002–03, listed with their team:

2003 trade deadline
Trading deadline: March 11, 2003.
Here is a list of major trades for the 2002–03 NHL trade deadline:
March 11, 2003: Anaheim traded D Mike Commodore and G Jean-Francois Damphousse to Calgary for C Rob Niedermayer.
March 11, 2003: Chicago traded D Phil Housley to Toronto for Calgary's fourth-round pick in the 2003 Entry Draft (if acquired) or Toronto's ninth-round pick in 2003 and fourth-round pick in 2004.
March 11, 2003 – Chicago Blackhawks trade Steve Thomas to Mighty Ducks of Anaheim for 2003 fifth round draft pick (Alexei Ivanov).
March 11, 2003: Edmonton traded RW Anson Carter and D Ales Pisa to NY Rangers for RW Radek Dvorak and D Cory Cross.
March 11, 2003: Edmonton traded D Janne Niinimaa and a conditional second-round pick in the 2003 Entry Draft to NY Islanders for LW Brad Isbister and LW Raffi Torres.
March 11, 2003: Florida traded RW Valeri Bure and a conditional pick in the 2004 Entry Draft to St. Louis for D Mike Van Ryn.
March 11, 2003: Los Angeles traded D Mathieu Schneider to Detroit for C Sean Avery, D Maxim Kuznetsov, Detroit's first-round pick in the 2003 Entry Draft and second-round pick in 2004.
March 11, 2003: Los Angeles traded C Bryan Smolinski to Ottawa for the rights to D Tim Gleason and future considerations.
March 11, 2003: Montreal traded C Doug Gilmour to Toronto for Toronto's sixth-round pick in the 2003 Entry Draft.
March 11, 2003: NY Islanders traded G Chris Osgood and the Islanders' third-round pick in the 2003 Entry Draft to St. Louis for C Justin Papineau and St. Louis' second-round pick in the 2003 Entry Draft.

For complete list, see NHL trade deadline.

See also
 List of Stanley Cup champions
 2003 Stanley Cup playoffs
 2002 NHL Entry Draft
 2002–03 NHL transactions
 53rd National Hockey League All-Star Game
 NHL All-Star Game
 NHL All-Rookie Team
 2002 in sports
 2003 in sports

References
 
Notes

External links
Hockey Database
NHL Official Website

 
1
1